No 1 Poultry is a building in the City of London, allocated to office and commercial use. It occupies the apex where the eastern ends of Poultry and Queen Victoria Street meet at Mansion House Street, the western approach to Bank junction.

The design, by James Stirling, was constructed after the architect's death. It replaced a neogothic, conical-turreted, predecessor retail building, owned by developer Rudolph Palumbo and subsequently by his son, developer Peter Palumbo. Another option was a modernist minor skyscraper designed by Ludwig Mies van der Rohe in the manner of the Seagram Building in New York City – but dropped having failed in an influential architectural and planning show-down in the 1970s. The tall but less towering design, in a postmodernist style with an outer shell of even bands of rose-pink and muted yellow stone, prevailed. The point of the apex, as before, has a clock face but higher, as above a large pointed apex set of 30 window panes.

In 2016, the landowner proposed exterior alteration. Building users, experts and neighbours persuaded the experts at the designated UK body to protect and recognise the building and did so in the notable grade II* listed building category, making it, within England, the youngest at the time. The rooftop restaurant was used for the apparent Queen's helicopter departure point in the 2012 Summer Olympics opening ceremony.

Overview

The present building was completed in 1997, five years after architect Stirling's death and three years after construction began. It is a postmodern structure, with use of bold, perhaps unsubtle, forms and colours in a compact assembly. It is clad in pink and yellow limestone in even stripes (and apex arch stones, that is voussoirs) whilst the courtyard, an atrium, displays some of Stirling's characteristic acidulous colour play.

Like many notable postmodern buildings, the imagery is rich in references. For example, from the sharp apex of the site a keyhole-shaped opening leads to a little-seen Scala Regia with a ramped floor, gold-leafed terminus and ancient Egyptian aura takes visitors into the heart of the building. Intended as site owner Palumbo's private entrance, this space is now little used: Palumbo sold the development before its completion. The turret above is sometimes likened to a submarine conning tower while the glazed thus two-sided clock is in concept and detail that of the Art Deco era Palazzo delle Poste, Naples.

Completed nearly two decades after the first designs were published, the building saw a range of muted and divided views from leading critics as the heyday of postmodernism was over. Amongst the readers of Time Out magazine, it was voted fifth-worst in London.

Following application generally supported by neighbours, users and experts, the building was protected and recognised by law as Grade II*-listed on 29 November 2016. The chief proponent was the Twentieth Century Society to block a planned redesign of the structure; thus the main opponent was the landowner.

Construction

As to the apex facing Mansion House, a Conservation Area, to rebuild drew much opposition particularly as standing there, in repairable condition, was a 19th-century neo-gothic listed building occupied by crown jewellers Mappin and Webb. It had been designed by John Belcher in 1870.

An office building and public plaza by Mies van der Rohe was pencilled for the site in 1969, to be Mansion House Square. The successful counter-argument was retold by Prince Charles in his 1984 "carbuncle" speech to RIBA, viewing such a plan as "yet another giant glass stump, better suited to downtown Chicago than the City of London" and the plans were eventually scrapped.

A major archaeological dig was undertaken by the Museum of London Archaeology Service, directed by Peter Rowsome. This excavation made significant discoveries, including a wooden drain along the main Roman road. Using dendrochronology, this was dated to 47 CE, proving Roman Londinium had developed in this part of the city by that date.

Construction was completed in 1997. The building took in other smaller buildings to the east.

Use
No 1 Poultry comprises a mixed space of retail and offices.

A restaurant occupies the rooftop, and has a terrace and formal garden with far-reaching City views for drinkers and diners. It featured in the opening ceremony of the 2012 Olympic Games in the segment 'Happy and Glorious' which saw Daniel Craig (as James Bond) transport Queen Elizabeth II to the Olympic Stadium by helicopter.

The terrace, below which is a fall of around 80 feet, has drawn notoriety in the City for having seen six cases of suicide by jumping off it: in 2007, 2009, twice in 2012, in 2015, and in 2016.

Owners
For four years the building was owned by a Heinrich Feldman company – selling it to Perella Weinberg Partners for £110 million, a 4.8% gain, in 2014.

References, footnotes and sources
References

Footnotes

Sources
 Rowsome, Peter. Heart of the City (Museum of London, 2000)

External links
Photographs of № 1 Poultry
Excavations at № 1 Poultry
Photo of previous (Neo Gothic) building
Successful banker jumped to his death from № 1 Poultry building

Office buildings in London
Postmodern architecture in the United Kingdom
Roman London
Commercial buildings completed in 1997
Buildings and structures in the City of London
Grade II* listed buildings in the City of London
Suicides in the United Kingdom
Grade II* listed office buildings